Fillmore County Airport , is a public use airport located close to Preston, a city in Fillmore County, Minnesota, United States. It is owned by Fillmore County.

The county acquired land for the airport in 1967.  A 3200 feet turf runway opened in 1970. The runway was first paved lighted in 1975.  The runway was extended to 4000 feet in 1989.  A parallel taxiway was added in 2005. The current Arrival/Departures building was opened in 1981 and is dedicated to Bernard Pietenpol. 

Although most U.S. airports use the same three-letter location identifier for the FAA and IATA, this airport is assigned FKA by the FAA but has no designation from the IATA.

References

External links 

Airports in Minnesota
Buildings and structures in Fillmore County, Minnesota
Transportation in Fillmore County, Minnesota